ICCF Belarus belongs to the ICCF national member federations.

Creation of BCCC
In 1992 in Byelorussia the Belorussian Committee of Correspondence Chess (BCCC) has been organized.

Champions 
The national champions since 1992 are: Gennady Libov, Vladimir Oleshkevich, Anatoly Solotinsky, Mikhail Klimenok, Boris Blitsko, Ivan Skvira, Boris Blitsko, Leonid Shetko, Alexei Malashenkov  and Yury Bakulin

Titled players

Grandmaster
Dmitry Vitalievich Lybin

Senior International Master
Boris Mikhailovich Blitsko
Vladislav Cheslavovich Dubko
Alexandr Sergeevich Ivanov
Mikhail Ivanovich Shablinsky
Sergei Ulasevich

Lady International Master
Tatyana Sergeevna Kozenko

International Master
Igor Victorovich Korshunov
Alexei Malashenko
Anatoly Vladimirovich Osipov
Vasily Victorovich Primakov
Abram Yakovlevich Roizman (+) 
Petr Vasilievich Skripko
Sergey Vadimovich Toldaev (+) 
Anatoly Pavlovich Voitsekh (+)

References

Belarus
Chess in Belarus
Correspondence chess
Correspondence chess organizations